The Wattle Cup Caterpillar (Calcarifera ordinata) is a moth of the family Limacodidae. It is widespread in northern Australia, south to Geraldton, Alice Springs and Brisbane.

The wingspan is about 30 mm. Adults are creamy brown with lines of dots on the forewings. The hind wings are pale brown.

The larvae feed on the leaves of Acacia, Jacksonia scoparia, Phoenix canariensis, Leptosema aphyllum, Rosa odorata, Citrus sinensis and Atalaya hemiglauca. The caterpillar is bright yellow with blue green and orange colours. There are a number of tubercles around its body. They have reduced legs and move using a slug-like movement of the underside of the body.

The cocoon is formed on a leaf. It is spun out of silk in a small sphere, then covered in a liquid that sets like a tiny ball.

It has an extremely potent sting, described as being "worse than three wasp stings".

References

External links
Australian Insects
Images
CSIRO Australian Moths Online

Limacodidae
Moths described in 1886
Moths of Australia
Taxa named by Arthur Gardiner Butler